Radivilov is a Ukrainian masculine surname, its feminine counterpart is Radivilova. It may refer to
Angelina Radivilova (born 1991), Ukrainian gymnast
Ihor Radivilov (born 1992), Ukrainian gymnast, husband of Angelina

Ukrainian-language surnames